Ray "Crash" Corrigan (born Raymond Benitz; February 14, 1902 – August 10, 1976) was an American actor most famous for appearing in many B-Western movies (among these the Three Mesquiteers and Range Busters film series). He also was a stuntman and frequently acted as silver screen gorillas using his own gorilla costumes.

In 1937, Corrigan purchased land in the Santa Susana Mountains foothills in Simi Valley and developed it into a movie ranch called "Corriganville". The movie ranch was used for location filming in film serials, feature films, and television shows, as well as for the performance of live western shows for tourists. Bob Hope later bought the ranch in 1966 and renamed it "Hopetown". It is now a Regional Park and nature preserve.

Film career

Corrigan's Hollywood career began as a physical fitness instructor and physical culture trainer to the stars. In the early 1930s he did stunts and bit parts in several films, billed as Ray Benard. Many of his early roles were in ape costumes, for example, as a gorilla in Tarzan and His Mate (1934) and an "orangopoid" in the first Flash Gordon serial.

Republic Pictures

In 1936, Corrigan had his screen breakthrough with the starring role in a Republic serial, The Undersea Kingdom, which evoked memories of Universal's first "Flash Gordon" serial. His character was known as Ray "Crash" Corrigan, and he adopted it as his screen name. He followed playing the role of John C. Fremont in the Western serial The Vigilantes Are Coming.

On the basis of this, Republic signed him to their standard Term Player Contract, running from May 25, 1936, to May 24, 1938. He was cast as one of the trio in the Three Mesquiteers series of westerns, starring in 24 of the 51 "3M" films made by the studio. He later left Republic in 1938 over a pay dispute. Over at Monogram Pictures, Corrigan began a new series of feature westerns shot at Corriganville, The Range Busters, cheap knock-offs of The Three Mesquiteers, with a series character that used his name; between 1940 and 1943, he starred in 20 of the 24 films in this series.

Gorilla Man

Following this, his on-screen work largely returned to appearing in ape costumes, beginning with The Strange Case of Doctor Rx (1942), followed by roles in Captive Wild Woman (1943), Nabonga (1944), White Pongo (1945) and as a prehistoric sloth in Unknown Island (1948). The original gorilla "mask" seen in films like The Ape (1940) was replaced with a subtler design with a more mobile jaw.

Corrigan sold his gorilla suits in 1948 and provided training in using them to their new owner, Steve Calvert, a Ciro's bartender. Calvert stepped into Corrigan's paw prints starting with a Jungle Jim film. Despite reports to the contrary, Calvert and Corrigan never appeared together on-screen in an ape costume. Since both Corrigan and Calvert eschewed screen credit playing gorillas, their film credits are often confused; any appearance of the "Corrigan suit" after 1948 is by Calvert.

His final theatrical film was playing the title role in the science fiction film It! The Terror from Beyond Space, according to bio information given to visitors at the Thousand Oaks, California, Corrigan’s Steak House and Bar that his son Tom once owned.

Television series
In 1950, he had a television show called Crash Corrigan's Ranch. He also planned a television series called Buckskin Rangers with his old associate Max Terhune.

Corriganville
In 1937, Corrigan was on a hunting trip with Clark Gable when he had an idea to purchase land in Simi Valley, California, and use it as a Western-themed ranch similar to Iverson Movie Ranch. He paid a $1,000 down payment, then a thousand dollars a month until the $11,354 price was paid. He developed this into Corriganville, a location used for many Western films and TV shows. The location featured many different types of terrain for producers such as lakes, mountains, and caves. Not merely set fronts, Corriganville contained actual buildings where film crews could live and store their equipment to save the time and expense of daily travel from studios to an outdoor location.

Corrigan profited well from renting this location to film studios and from paying visitors. In 1949, Corrigan opened his ranch to the public on weekends for Western-themed entertainment. The weekend attractions included stuntmen shows throughout the day, a Cavalry fort set, an outlaw shack, a full western town with saloon, jail, and hotel, live western music, Indian crafts, stagecoach rides, pony rides, and boating on the ranch's artificial lake. It was common for film and TV personalities to appear in person for photos and autographs, attracting as many as 20,000 people on weekends.

Examples of feature films and TV shows that were filmed at Corriganville:
Drums of Fu Manchu (1939)
Fort Apache (1948)
The Lone Ranger (1949–1957)
The Cisco Kid (1950–1956)
The Adventures of Kit Carson (1951–1955)
The Adventures of Rin Tin Tin (1954–1959)
Have Gun – Will Travel (1957–1963)
Casey Jones (1957)

Hollywood cowboy stars who filmed there include: Gene Autry, Roy Rogers, Buster Crabbe, John Wayne, Smiley Burnette, Clayton Moore, Jay Silverheels, Charles Starrett, Ken Maynard, Hoot Gibson, Bob Steele, Tex Ritter, and Corrigan himself.

Corriganville was eventually sold to Bob Hope in 1966, becoming Hopetown. Today, what remains is known as Corriganville Park and features some of the old landmarks. Signs along a hiking trail point out the historic features.

Nickname
The origin of the "Crash" nickname is from his football-playing days. This was verified by Corrigan himself when he was a contestant on the June 11, 1959, episode of You Bet Your Life starring Groucho Marx. When asked how he got the name "Crash", Corrigan told Groucho, "When I would go to tackle somebody or instead of fighting them with my fists, I would just take off and dive at them head first and that's how I acquired the name 'Crash'".

His first starring role using the name professionally was in the Republic Pictures' serial The Undersea Kingdom (1936), in which his screen character was also named "Crash Corrigan". The serial was created to capitalize on the popularity of Universal Pictures' Flash Gordon serials, and the nickname may have been appropriated by Republic's publicity department to create a similarly named hero.

Death
Following his death from a heart attack at age 74 on August 10, 1976, in Brookings Harbor, Oregon, Ray "Crash" Corrigan was interred at Inglewood Park Cemetery, Inglewood, California. More than four decades later, his grave still remains unmarked, without a headstone.

Filmography

 Tarzan the Ape Man (1932) – Ape / Stuntman (uncredited)
 Tarzan and His Mate (1934) – Gorilla / Stuntman (uncredited)
 Hollywood Party (1934) – Ping Pong the Gorilla (uncredited)
 Murder in the Private Car (1934) – Naba the Gorilla (uncredited)
 Tomorrow's Children (1934) – Intern (uncredited)
 Romance in the Rain (1934) – (uncredited)
 The Phantom Empire (1935, Serial) – Thunder Rider (uncredited)
 Night Life of the Gods (1935) – Apollo
 She (1935) – Guard (uncredited)
 Dante's Inferno (1935) – Devil (uncredited)
 Mutiny on the Bounty (1935) – Able Bodied Seaman (uncredited)
 The Singing Vagabond (1935) – Private Hobbs (uncredited)
 Darkest Africa (1936, Serial) – Bonga / Samabi (uncredited)
 The Leathernecks Have Landed (1936) – Officer of the Day (uncredited)
 Flash Gordon (1936, Serial) – Orangopoid / Stuntman (uncredited)
 Undersea Kingdom (1936, Serial) – Crash Corrigan
 Kelly the Second (1936) – Fight Arena Doorman (uncredited)
 The Vigilantes Are Coming (1936) – Captain John Charles Fremont, US Army Captain (uncreidted)
 The Three Mesquiteers (1936) – Tucson Smith
 Ghost-Town Gold (1936) – Tucson Smith
 Country Gentlemen (1936) – Briggs
 Roarin' Lead (1936) – Tucson Smith
 Riders of the Whistling Skull (1937) – Tucson Smith
 Join the Marines (1937) – Lt. Hodge
 Round-Up Time in Texas (1937) – Gorilla (uncredited)
 Hit the Saddle (1937) – Tucson Smith
 Gunsmoke Ranch (1937) – Tucson Smith
 Come on, Cowboys (1937) – Tucson Smith
 The Painted Stallion (1937) – Clark Stuart
 Range Defenders (1937) – Tucson Smith
 Heart of the Rockies (1937) – Tucson Smith
 The Trigger Trio (1937) – Tucson Smith
 Wild Horse Rodeo (1937) – Tucson Smith
 The Purple Vigilantes (1938) – Tucson Smith
 Call the Mesquiteers (1938) – Tucson Smith
 Outlaws of Sonora (1938) – Tucson Smith
 Riders of the Black Hills (1938) – Tucson Smith
 Three Missing Links (1938, Short) – Naba, the Gorilla
 Heroes of the Hills (1938) – Tucson Smith
 Pals of the Saddle (1938) – Tucson Smith
 Overland Stage Raiders (1938) – Tucson Smith
 Santa Fe Stampede (1938) – Tucson Smith
 Red River Range (1938) – Tucson Smith
 The Night Riders (1939) – Tucson Smith
 Three Texas Steers (1939) – Tucson Smith / Willie the Gorilla
 Wyoming Outlaw (1939) – Tucson Smith
 New Frontier (1939) – Tucson Smith
 The Range Busters (1940) – 'Crash' Corrigan
 The Ape (1940) – Nabu the Gorilla (uncredited)
 Trailing Double Trouble (1940) – 'Crash' Corrigan
 West of Pinto Basin (1940) – 'Crash' Corrigan
 Trail of the Silver Spurs (1941) – Crash Corrigan
 The Kid's Last Ride (1941) – Crash Corrigan
 Tumbledown Ranch in Arizona (1941) – Crash Corrigan
 Wrangler's Roost (1941) – Crash Corrigan
 Fugitive Valley (1941) – Crash Corrigan
 Saddle Mountain Roundup (1941) – Crash Corrigan
 Tonto Basin Outlaws (1941) – Crash Corrigan
 Underground Rustlers (1941) – Crash Corrigan
 Thunder River Feud (1942) – 'Crash' Corrigan
 Rock River Renegades (1942) – 'Crash' Corrigan
 The Strange Case of Doctor Rx (1942) – Nbongo the Gorilla (uncredited)
 Boot Hill Bandits (1942) – Marshal 'Crash' Corrigan
 Texas Trouble Shooters (1942) – 'Crash' Corrigan
 Arizona Stage Coach (1942) – Crash Corrigan
 Dr. Renault's Secret (1942) – Ape (uncredited)
 Land of Hunted Men (1943) – 'Crash' Corrigan
 Cowboy Commandos (1943) – Crash Corrigan
 Captive Wild Woman (1943) – Cheela the Gorilla (uncredited)
 Black Market Rustlers (1943) – 'Crash' Corrigan
 Bullets and Saddles (1943) – 'Crash' Corrigan
 She's for Me (1943) – Gorilla Man
 The Phantom (1944, Serial) – Brutus the Gorilla (uncredited)
 Nabonga (1944) – Gorilla
 The Monster Maker (1944) – Gorilla (uncredited)
 The Hairy Ape (1944) – Goliath the Gorilla (uncredited)
 The Monster and the Ape (1945) – Thor (uncredited)
 The White Gorilla (1945) – Steve Collins / Konga – the White Gorilla / Narrator
 White Pongo (1945) – White Pongo (uncredited)
 Renegade Girl (1946) – William Quantrill
 Miraculous Journey (1948) – Gorilla (uncredited)
 Unknown Island (1948) – Monster (uncredited)
 Crime on Their Hands (1948) – Gorilla (uncredited)
 The Lost Tribe (1949) – Simba the Gorilla (uncredited)
 Zamba (1949) – Zamba the Gorilla
 The Adventures of Sir Galahad (1949) – One-Eye (Innkeeper) / Stuntman
 Forbidden Jungle (1950) – Gege the Gorilla (uncredited)
 Crash Corrigan's Ranch (1950, TV Series) – Host
 Trail of Robin Hood (1950) – Crash Corrigan
 Bela Lugosi Meets a Brooklyn Gorilla (1952) – Gorilla (uncredited)
 The Great Adventures of Captain Kidd (1953) – Docklin (uncredited)
 Killer Ape (1953) – Norley
 Man with the Steel Whip (1954, Serial) – Painted Stallion Character (archive footage) (uncredited)
 Apache Ambush (1955) – Hank Calvin
 Zombies of Mora Tau (1957) – Sailor
 Domino Kid (1957) – Buck (uncredited)
 The Bride and the Beast (1958) – Spanky (the wife-stealing gorilla) (uncredited)
 It! The Terror from Beyond Space (1958) – It

References

Notes

Bibliography

 Gilpatrick, Kristen. Famous Wisconsin Film Stars. London: Badger Books, 2002. .
 Schneider, Jerry L.Corriganville Movie Ranch. Raleigh, North Carolina: Lulu.com, 2007. .

External links

 
 Official Corriganville Park website

1902 births
1976 deaths
American male film actors
Male Western (genre) film actors
Male film serial actors
Male actors from Milwaukee
People from Simi Valley, California
Burials at Inglewood Park Cemetery
20th-century American male actors